T2 is the name of a tramcar, produced by Tatra. The tramcar was produced between 1955 and 1962, and a total of 771 cars were produced.

The very first T2 prototypes were tested as number 6001 and 6002 in Prague in 1955. In 1958, the first series of produced cars were delivered to almost all Czechoslovak networks.

The T2s were more durable than their predecessor, the T1, and so also more long-lived. The last T2s were superseded in the 1980s, although some vehicles remain in museums. Some T1 vehicles were converted into T3 during the 1960s.

T2SU 
The T2SUs were T2 cars that were delivered to the Soviet Union, hence the suffix -SU. The cars differed from the Czechoslovak version, particularly by the removal of the middle door, making room for more seats. The fare-collection system in most of the Soviet Union maintained that all people pay for their ride, thus the requirement for passengers to board from the rear door and depart from the front door. Removal of the middle door was hence required by contractors to avoid free-riders.
 
The last T2SUs were withdrawn from service in the 1980s. In total, 380 T2SU cars were delivered to the Soviet Union.

T2R 
In the 1970s and 1980s, 112 T2 trams were modernized into T2R. Modernization included overhauling of electrical equipment (similar to Tatra T3) and some changes in the car body. That modernization helped the trams to survive into the 1990s. Two T2Rs were remodernized in the early 2000s in Liberec and these two remained in everyday use till 2018. In Brno, Liberec and Ostrava four other T2Rs are used as service trams.

Production 
771 trams were produced from 1955 to 1962 and delivered to:

Note: This is a production list. Public transport companies may sell used trams to other companies, thus the number of cities with a history of these trams may be higher.

Photo gallery

References

Tatra trams
Tram vehicles of the Czech Republic